Marek Szerszyński (born 8 October 1960) is a Polish racing cyclist. He rode in the 1993 Tour de France.

References

1960 births
Living people
Polish male cyclists
Place of birth missing (living people)